{{DISPLAYTITLE:C18H22O3}}
The molecular formula C18H22O3 may refer to:

 Hydroxyestrones
 2-Hydroxyestrone
 4-Hydroxyestrone
 16α-Hydroxyestrone
 16β-Hydroxyestrone
 16-Ketoestradiol
 Methallenestril